Jia Ruskaja (born Evgeniya Fyodorovna Borisenko, Russian: Евгения Фёдоровна Борисенко; 6 January 1902 – 19 April 1970) was a Russian dancer and choreographer who established a national dance school in Italy. Her stage name "Jia Ruskaja", which means "I am Russian", was used for the first time by Anton Giulio Bragaglia.

Biography
With her father, an officer in the Russian Imperial Army, Ruskaja fled Russia in 1918 just after the October Revolution. She studied dance in Crimea, before attending medical school in Geneva. Ruskaja married Evans Daniel Pole in Constantinople in 1920; after their marriage was annulled, their son lived in 
London with his father. Her dancing debut occurred 4 June 1921 in Rome at the Casa d'Arte Bragaglia. She opened her first ballet school in Milan at the Teatro Dal Verme in 1929. From 1932–34, she directed the La Scala Theatre Ballet School. After her marriage to Aldo Borelli, editor of Corriere della Sera, Ruskaja received Italian citizenship. In 1940, she founded the Royal School of Dance, initially attached to the Accademia Nazionale di Arte Drammatica Silvio D'Amico, which became independent in 1948 as Accademia nazionale di danza, a school which only admitted women. She was its director until 1970. Daisy Parrilla and Eleonora Abbagnato had contentious claims to the “Premio Roma Jia Russkaja” prize in 2011.

Selected filmography
Judith and Holofernes (1929)

Awards
1962, Premio Minerva d’Oro

References

1902 births
1970 deaths
Russian ballerinas
Russian choreographers
Italian ballerinas
Italian choreographers
People from Kerch
Founders of educational institutions
White Russian emigrants to Italy
Emigrants from the Russian Empire to Italy
20th-century Russian ballet dancers
20th-century Russian women